Tagetes filifolia is a New World species of marigolds in the family Asteraceae. It is widespread across much of Latin America from northern Mexico to Argentina. Common name is Irish lace despite the fact that the plant does not grow in Ireland.

Tagetes filifolia is a branching annual herb up to 50 cm (20 inches) tall. It has a strong aroma similar to that of anise or liquorice. Leaves resemble small branching, feathery threads.

People of the native range of the species use it as a food flavoring, a tea, and a diuretic.

References

External links
photo of herbarium specimen at Missouri Botanical garden, collected in Bolivia in 2011

filifolia
Flora of Central America
Flora of Mexico
Flora of South America
Plants described in 1816